In cryptography, an interpolation attack is a type of cryptanalytic attack against block ciphers.

After the two attacks, differential cryptanalysis and linear cryptanalysis, were presented on block ciphers, some new block ciphers were introduced, which were proven secure against differential and linear attacks. Among these there were some iterated block ciphers such as the KN-Cipher and the SHARK cipher. However, Thomas Jakobsen and Lars Knudsen showed in the late 1990s that these ciphers were easy to break by introducing a new attack called the interpolation attack.

In the attack, an algebraic function is used to represent an S-box. This may be a simple quadratic, or a polynomial or rational function over a Galois field. Its coefficients can be determined by standard Lagrange interpolation techniques, using known plaintexts as data points. Alternatively, chosen plaintexts can be used to simplify the equations and optimize the attack.

In its simplest version an interpolation attack expresses the ciphertext as a polynomial of the plaintext. If the polynomial has a relative low number of unknown coefficients, then with a collection of plaintext/ciphertext (p/c) pairs, the polynomial can be reconstructed. With the polynomial reconstructed the attacker then has a representation of the encryption, without exact knowledge of the secret key.

The interpolation attack can also be used to recover the secret key.

It is easiest to describe the method with an example.

Example

Let an iterated cipher be given by 

where  is the plaintext,  the output of the  round,  the secret  round key (derived from the secret key  by some key schedule), and for a -round iterated cipher,  is the ciphertext.

Consider the 2-round cipher. Let  denote the message, and  denote the ciphertext.

Then the output of round 1 becomes

and the output of round 2 becomes

Expressing the ciphertext as a polynomial of the plaintext yields

where the 's are key dependent constants.

Using as many plaintext/ciphertext pairs as the number of unknown coefficients in the polynomial , then we can construct the polynomial. This can for example be done by Lagrange Interpolation (see Lagrange polynomial). When the unknown coefficients have been determined, then we have a representation  of the encryption, without knowledge of the secret key .

Existence

Considering an -bit block cipher, then there are  possible plaintexts, and therefore  distinct  pairs. Since we require as many  pairs as the number of unknown coefficients in the polynomial, then an interpolation attack exist only if .

Time complexity

Assume that the time to construct the polynomial  using  pairs are small, in comparison to the time to encrypt the required plaintexts.

Interpolation attack by Meet-In-The-Middle
Often this method is more efficient. Here is how it is done.

Let  be the expression of  via , and let  be the expression of  via . The polynomial  is obtain by computing forward using the iterated formula of the cipher until round , and the polynomial   is obtain by computing backwards from the iterated formula of the cipher starting from round  until round .

So it should hold that

Time complexity
Assume that  can be expressed by  coefficients, and  can be expressed by  coefficients. Then we would need  known distinct  pairs to solve the equation by setting it up as a matrix equation. However, this matrix equation is solvable up to a multiplication and an addition. So to make sure that we get a unique and non-zero solution, we set the coefficient corresponding to the highest degree to one, and the constant term to zero. Therefore,   known distinct  pairs are required.

By the Meet-In-The-Middle approach the total number of coefficients is usually smaller than using the normal method. This makes the method more efficient, since less   pairs are required.

Key-recovery
We can also use the interpolation attack to recover the secret key .

If we remove the last round of an -round iterated cipher with block length , the output of the cipher becomes . Call the cipher the reduced cipher. The idea is to make a guess on the last round key , such that we can decrypt one round to obtain the output  of the reduced cipher. Then to verify the guess we use the interpolation attack on the reduced cipher either by the normal method or by the Meet-In-The-Middle method. Here is how it is done.

By the normal method we express the output  of the reduced cipher as a polynomial of the plaintext . Call the polynomial . Then if we can express  with  coefficients, then using  known distinct  pairs, we can construct the polynomial. To verify the guess of the last round key, then check with one extra  pair if it holds that

If yes, then with high probability the guess of the last round key was correct. If no, then make another guess of the key.

By the Meet-In-The-Middle method we express the output  from round  as a polynomial of the plaintext  and as a polynomial of the output of the reduced cipher . Then with  known distinct  pairs we can find the coefficients. To verify the guess of the last round key, then check with one extra  pair if it holds that

If yes, then with high probability the guess of the last round key was correct. If no, then make another guess of the key.

Once we have found the correct last round key, then we can continue in a similar fashion on the remaining round keys.

Time complexity
With a secret round key of length , then there are  different keys. Each with probability  to be correct if chosen at random. Therefore, we will on average have to make  guesses before finding the correct key.

Hence, the normal method have average time complexity , requiring  known distinct  pairs, and the Meet-In-The-Middle method have average time complexity , requiring  known distinct  pairs.

Real world application

The block cipher SHARK uses SP-network with S-box . The cipher is resistant against differential and linear cryptanalysis after 
a small number of rounds. However it was broken in 1996 by Thomas Jakobsen and Lars Knudsen, using interpolation attack. Denote by SHARK a version of SHARK with block size  bits using   parallel -bit S-boxes in  rounds. Jakobsen and Knudsen found that there exist an interpolation attack on SHARK (64-bit block cipher) using about  chosen plaintexts, and an interpolation attack on SHARK (128-bit block cipher)  using about  chosen plaintexts.

Also Thomas Jakobsen introduced a probabilistic version of the interpolation attack using Madhu Sudan's algorithm for improved decoding of Reed-Solomon codes. This attack can work even when an algebraic relationship between plaintexts and ciphertexts holds for only a fraction of values.

References 
 
  (Video of presentation at Google Video—uses Flash)
 
 
 

Cryptographic attacks